The Parliament of Trinidad and Tobago is the legislative branch of the Government of Trinidad and Tobago.  The Parliament is bicameral. Besides the President of Trinidad and Tobago, it is composed of the House of Representatives, which is composed of the Speaker of the House of Representatives in addition to 41 directly elected members serving a five-year term in single-seat constituencies, and the Senate which has 31 members appointed by the President: 16 Government Senators appointed on the advice of the Prime Minister, 6 Opposition Senators appointed on the advice of the Leader of the Opposition and 9 Independent Senators appointed by the President to represent other sectors of civil society. It is at present the only parliament in the world with an incumbent female President, President of the Senate, Speaker of the House of Representatives and Leader of the Opposition and made history by appointing the Caribbean's first and only transgender parliamentarian on 15 February 2022.  As of 20 April 2021, there are only 24 female members, or 32.9% and eight members born in Tobago or 11.0%.

Speaker of the House and President of the Senate

International affiliation(s) 
ACP–EU Joint Parliamentary Assembly
Canada-Caribbean Parliamentary Friendship Group
Commonwealth Parliamentary Association
Inter-Parliamentary Union IPU

See also
House of Representatives of Trinidad and Tobago
Senate of Trinidad and Tobago
Elections in Trinidad and Tobago
List of political parties in Trinidad and Tobago
Politics of Trinidad and Tobago
List of parliaments of Trinidad and Tobago
The Red House, Parliament building

References

Notes

External links
 

Government of Trinidad and Tobago
Politics of Trinidad and Tobago
Political organisations based in Trinidad and Tobago
Trinidad
Trinidad and Tobago
Trinidad and Tobago